Gunther's banded tree frog (Boana fasciata) is a species of frog in the family Hylidae. The species was re-delimited in 2014 and the most of the earlier records assigned to this species refer to Boana maculateralis, Boana alfaroi, Boana tetete, and possibly also to an unnamed species.

References

Boana
Amphibians of Ecuador
Amphibians of Peru
Amphibians described in 1858
Taxa named by Albert Günther
Taxonomy articles created by Polbot